Subramani Balada Kalaiah (born 24 April 1962) is an Indian field hockey player. He competed in the men's tournament at the 1988 Summer Olympics.

References

External links
 

1962 births
Living people
Kodava people
People from Kodagu district
Field hockey players from Karnataka
Indian male field hockey players
Olympic field hockey players of India
Field hockey players at the 1988 Summer Olympics
Place of birth missing (living people)